Pleasant Grove or Pleasant Groves  may refer to:

United States
Pleasant Grove, Alabama, a city
Pleasant Groves, Alabama, a town
Pleasant Grove, California, an unincorporated community
Pleasant Grove, Georgia, an unincorporated community
 Pleasant Grove Township, Coles County, Illinois
 Pleasant Grove, Illinois, an unincorporated community
 Pleasant Grove (Keene, Kentucky), listed on the National Register of Historic Places in Jessamine County, Kentucky
Pleasant Grove, Maryland, an unincorporated community
Pleasant Grove Township, Olmsted County, Minnesota
Pleasant Grove, Missouri, a ghost town
Pleasant Grove, Alamance County, North Carolina, an unincorporated community
Pleasant Grove Camp Meeting Ground, Waxhaw, North Carolina
Pleasant Grove, Ohio, a census-designated place
Pleasant Grove, Belmont County, Ohio, an unincorporated community
Pleasant Grove, Tennessee, an unincorporated community
Pleasant Grove, Dallas, a community in Dallas, Texas
 Pleasant Grove (Halifax, Virginia), a historic home
 Pleasant Grove (Palmyra, Virginia), a historic home
 Pleasant Grove (Salem, Virginia), a historic home
Pleasant Grove, Utah, a city
Pleasant Grove Historic District